Yunus Akgün (born 7 July 2000) is a Turkish professional footballer who plays as a winger for the Turkish club Galatasaray in the Süper Lig.

Professional career

Galatasaray
Akgün is a product of the Galatasaray youth academy, joining in 2011. He made his professional debut for Galatasaray in the 2018 Turkish Super Cup 1–1 (5–4) penalty shootout loss against Akhisar Belediyespor on 5 August 2018.

On 29 January 2019, Akgün scored a hat-trick in 4–1 win of Turkish Cup match against Boluspor.

Adana Demirspor (loans)
On 6 September 2021, Adana Demirspor re-hired Akgün, who played last season, from Galatasaray.

International career
Akgün is a youth international for Turkey. He represented the Turkey U17s at the 2017 UEFA European Under-17 Championship, and the 2017 FIFA U-17 World Cup.

International goals
Scores and results list Turkey's goal tally first.

Honours
Galatasaray
 Süper Lig: 2018–19
 Turkish Cup: 2018–19
 Turkish Super Cup: 2019

References

External links
 
 
 
 
 Yunus Akgün at Galatasaray.org

2000 births
Living people
People from Küçükçekmece
Turkish footballers
Turkey international footballers
Turkey youth international footballers
Galatasaray S.K. footballers
Süper Lig players
Association football midfielders
TFF First League players
Adana Demirspor footballers